The Naucrary was a subdivision of the people of Attica, among the most ancient in the Athenian state. Each was led by an official called a naucrarus. All sources for the institution date from after it had ceased to be particularly important and thus the nature of the naucraries is highly disputed in modern scholarship. They seem to have played a role in fiscal management and naval organisation.

Etymology
The word is derived either from naus (ναῦς "a ship") and describes the duty imposed upon each naucrary, of providing one ship and two (or, more probably, ten) horsemen; or from naio (ναίω "I dwell"), in which case it has to do with a householder census. The former is generally accepted in view of the fact that the naucraries were certainly the units on which the Athenian fleet was based.

History
The institution was most important in the Archaic period, when they seem to have been key magistrates of local administration. Three ancient sources offer explicit definitions of the naucrary. The second-century BC grammarian, Ammonius of Alexandria states:

In the ninth-century AD, Lexicon of Photius, the naucrari are defined as 

According to the Aristotlean Constitution of the Athenians (8.3), in the sixth century BC, each of the four Ionian tribes of Athens was divided into three trittyes ("thirds"), each of which was subdivided into four naucraries; there were thus 48 naucraries.

The earliest mention of the term is in Herodotus (v. 71), where it is stated that the Cylonian conspiracy in 632 BC was put down by the "Prytaneis (chief men) of the naucraries."

The Encyclopedia Britannica conjectured that the military forces of Athens were organized on the basis of the naucraries, and that it was the duty of the presidents of these districts to raise the local levies. But it notes that the Athenaion Politeia does not connect the naucrary with the fleet or the army, observing that "from chapter 8 (of the text) it would appear that its importance was chiefly in connection with finance," and concludes:

In the reforms of Cleisthenes, the naucraries gave place to the demes as the political unit. In accordance with the new decimal system, their number was increased to fifty. Whether they continued (and if so, how long) to supply one ship and two (or ten) horsemen each is not certainly known. Cheidemus in Photius asserts that they did, and his statement is to a certain extent corroborated by Herodotus (vi. 89) who records that, in the Aeginetan War before the Persian Invasion, the Athenian fleet numbered only fifty sail.

See also
 Trierarchy

Sources

Further reading
 The Constitutional Antiquities of Sparta and Athens. By Gustav Gilbert. Pg 133+
Photius, who is clearly using the Ath. Pol. (he quotes from it the last part of his article totidem verbis)
Schomann, Antiq. (p. 326, Eng. trans.) — quoted by JE Sandys (Ath. Pol., viii., 13) — refutes Gilbert, Greek Constitutional Antiquities (Eng. trans., 1895), and in Jahrb. Class. Phil. cxi. (1875) pp. 9 seq.
AHJ Greenidge, Handbook of Greek Const. Hist. p. 134
for derivation of name, G Meyer, Curtius Studien (vii. 175). where Wecklein is refuted.

Government of ancient Athens
Navy of ancient Athens
Archaic Athens
Types of administrative division